Randall Morrison (born 12 February 1984 in East London) is a South African-born Romanian rugby union football player. He plays as a flanker for professional Liga Națională de Rugby club Știința Petroșani.

Career
Before joining Romanian Liga Nationala club in 2013, SCM Timisoara, Randall Morrison played for Border Bulldogs and Golden Lions. Randall played for Timisoara until 2021 and won an impressive 4 titles and 4 Romanian cups. 

He also played for Romania's national team, the Oaks, making his international debut at the 2015 World Rugby Nations Cup in a match against the Welwitschias.

Honours
SCM Rugby Timișoara
Liga Națională de Rugby: 2013, 2015, 2017, 2018
Cupa României: 2014, 2015, 2016, 2021

References

External links

 Randall Morrison at Timișoara Saracens website

1984 births
Living people
Border Bulldogs players
Golden Lions players
Romania international rugby union players
Romanian rugby union players
Rugby union flankers
Rugby union players from East London, Eastern Cape
SCM Rugby Timișoara players
South African rugby union players